Naturaleza muerta can refer to a work of art depicting inanimate subject matter.

It can also refer to:

Naturaleza muerta, a 2003 film starring Hugo Stiglitz
Naturaleza muerta, also known as Still Life, a 2014 Argentinian thriller film
Naturaleza muerta con cachimba, a book by José Donoso
Naturaleza muerta (Rosas), a painting by Frida Kahlo
Naturaleza muerta, a 1954 painting by Rufino Tamayo
Naturaleza Muerta, a 1956 painting by Pedro Coronel

Music
Naturaleza Muerta, a song by Mecano, featured on their 1991 album Aidalai
Naturaleza Muerta, a 2008 album by Argentinian hard rock band O'Connor
Naturaleza muerta, a 2001 album by Spanish electronic pop duo Fangoria
Naturaleza muerta, a song by Gustavo Cerati, released on his album Fuerza natural